Walter Thomae (born 4 November 1966) is a German football coach.

In November 2015 Thomae became head coach of VfB Stuttgart II. He left the club in the summer 2016.

References

1966 births
Living people
German football managers
3. Liga managers
VfB Stuttgart II managers